is a Nippon Professional Baseball pitcher for the Yomiuri Giants in Japan's Central League.

His wife is Japanese idol Rika Ishikawa.

External links

Living people
1987 births
People from Dazaifu, Fukuoka
Japanese baseball players
Nippon Professional Baseball pitchers
Saitama Seibu Lions players
Yomiuri Giants　players